Pidikkaparambu is a very small area that comes under the Vallachira Panchayat and is famous for the Pidikkaparambu Lord Shiva Temple located here.

Festivals
The Pidikkaparambu Pooram is held here and is accompanied with "Anayottam - Tusker Race/Jumbo Rally" that takes place in the Paddy Fields located nearby. This festival takes place in the month of March or April every year. It normally lasts for 2 –3 days.

Terrain
This area has lush Paddy fields, Coconut Plantations and an uninterrupted Supply of fresh Water.

There is a well maintained Blacktop road that can take one all the way to "Chathakudam Centre" which has a few Grocery and Stationery Stores, a couple of Cafeterias,a Post Office and a Gent's Saloon.
The State Bank of India - Vallachira Branch is also located nearby.

Schools
The Closest School (Kerala Govt) would be Vallachira UP School and Kadalassery LP School.

Transportation
There are no Public Transport Systems that are Servicing Pidikkaparambu currently. However, There are Privately managed Bus Services from Chathakudam Centre to Thrissur everyday from dawn till dusk. Private Auto Rickshaws and Taxis could be hired from Chatakudam centre mostly during the weekdays.

References

Villages in Thrissur district